was a town located in Ashikita District, Kumamoto Prefecture, Japan.

As of 2003, the town had an estimated population of 5,136 and a density of 156.78 persons per km². The total area was 32.76 km².

On January 1, 2005, Tanoura was merged into the expanded town of Ashikita and no longer exists as an independent municipality.

External links
 Official website of Ashikita 

Dissolved municipalities of Kumamoto Prefecture